Pyotr Gorelikov (16 December 1931 – 23 October 2017) was a Russian sailor. He competed in the Finn event at the 1952 Summer Olympics.

References

External links
 

1931 births
2017 deaths
Russian male sailors (sport)
Soviet male sailors (sport)
Olympic sailors of the Soviet Union
Sailors at the 1952 Summer Olympics – Finn
Sportspeople from Ashgabat